The 1972 WCHA Men's Ice Hockey Tournament was the 13th conference playoff in league history. The tournament was played between March 7 and March 11, 1972. All games were played at home team campus sites, including each of the two regional final series. By winning the regional tournaments, both Wisconsin and Denver were invited to participate in the 1972 NCAA Division I Men's Ice Hockey Tournament.

Though not official designations, Wisconsin is considered as the East Regional Champion† and Denver as the West Regional Champion‡.

Format
The top eight teams in the WCHA, according to their final conference standings, were eligible for the tournament and were seeded No. 1 through No. 8. In the first round the first and eighth seeds, the second and seventh seeds, the third and sixth seeds and the fourth and fifth seeds were matched in two-game series where the school that scored the higher number of goals was declared the winner. After the first round the remaining teams were reseeded No. 1 through No. 4 according to their final conference standings and advanced to the second round. In the second round the first and fourth seeds and the second and third seeds competed in an additional two-game, total goal series with the winners of each being declared as co-conference champions.

Conference standings
Note: GP = Games played; W = Wins; L = Losses; T = Ties; PTS = Points; GF = Goals For; GA = Goals Against

Bracket

Teams are reseeded after the first round

Note: * denotes overtime period(s)

First round

(1) Denver vs. (8) Notre Dame

(2) Wisconsin vs. (7) Michigan Tech

(3) North Dakota vs. (6) Michigan

(4) Michigan State vs. (5) Minnesota-Duluth

Second round

(1) Denver vs. (4) Michigan State

(2) Wisconsin vs. (3) North Dakota

Tournament awards
None

See also
Western Collegiate Hockey Association men's champions

References

External links
WCHA.com
1971–72 WCHA Standings
1971–72 NCAA Standings
2013–14 Denver Pioneers Media Guide
2013–14 Michigan Wolverines Media Guide; Through the Years
2013–14 Michigan State Spartans Media Guide; Section 5
2012–13 Minnesota-Duluth Bulldogs Media Guide
2013–14 North Dakota Hockey Media Guide
2008–09 Notre Dame Fighting Irish Media Guide; History
2003–04 Wisconsin Badgers Media Guide

WCHA Men's Ice Hockey Tournament
Wcha